The 2022–23 Colorado Buffaloes men's basketball team represented the University of Colorado Boulder in the 2022–23 NCAA Division I men's basketball season. They were led by head coach Tad Boyle in his thirteenth season at Colorado. The Buffaloes played their home games at CU Events Center in Boulder, Colorado as members of the Pac-12 Conference.

Previous season
The Buffaloes finished the season 21–12, 12–8 in Pac-12 Play to finish in 4th place. They defeated Oregon in the quarterfinals of the Pac-12 tournament before losing in the semifinals to Arizona. They received an at-large bid to the National Invitation Tournament where they lost in the first round to St. Bonaventure.

Off-season

Departures

Incoming transfers

2022 recruiting class

Roster

Schedule and results

|-
!colspan=12 style=| Exhibition

|-
!colspan=12 style=| Regular season 

|-
!colspan=12 style=| Pac-12 Tournament

|-
!colspan=12 style=| NIT tournament

Rankings

References

Colorado
Colorado Buffaloes men's basketball seasons
Colorado Buffaloes men's basketball
Colorado Buffaloes men's basketball
Colorado